The women's 3000 metres steeplechase at the 2006 European Athletics Championships were held at the Ullevi on August 10 and August 12.

First women's steeplechase event in European Athletics Championships. Alesia Turava takes the win three days after her sister had won 20 km walking competition.

Medalists

Schedule

Results

Semifinals
First 4 in each heat (Q) and the next 4 fastest (q) advance to the Final.

Final

External links
Results

Steeplechase
Steeplechase at the European Athletics Championships
2006 in women's athletics